A brand is anything that is used to identify and distinguish a specific product, service or business.

Brand may also refer to:

Places
 Brand (Aachen), a district of Aachen, Germany
 Brand, Netherlands, a hamlet in the municipality of Nuth, the Netherlands
 Brand (Saxon Switzerland), a mountain in Germany
 Brand, Bavaria, a municipality in Bavaria, Germany
 Brand, Vorarlberg, a municipality in Austria
 Division of Brand, an Australian electoral division

Names
 Brand (surname)
 Brands (surname)

Arts and entertainment
 Brand (play), an 1865 play by Henrik Ibsen, also the name of the protagonist
 A Brand, a Belgian rock band
 Brand (literary magazine), a 2007–2012 British periodical
 Brand (Rivan Warder), from The Belgariad
 the title character of Bill Brand, a 1976 British TV drama series
 Brand, a character from the Chronicles of Amber universe

Other uses
 , several Norwegian warships
 Brand Brewery, a Dutch brewery owned by Heineken
 Brand (magazine), an anarchist magazine published since 1898
 Brand's, a British health supplement manufacturer now owned by Cerebos Pacific
 The Brand, another name for the Aryan Brotherhood
 Brand, the standardized botanical abbreviation for August Brand (1863–1930)

See also
 Branding (disambiguation)
 Brandt (disambiguation)
 Brant (disambiguation)